Conescharellinidae is a family of bryozoans belonging to the order Cheilostomatida.

Genera:
 Bipora Whitelegge, 1887
 Conescharellina d'Orbigny, 1852
 Crucescharellina Silén, 1947
 Flabellopora d'Orbigny, 1851
 Trochosodon Canu & Bassler, 1927
 Zeuglopora Maplestone, 1909

References

Cheilostomatida